This is the list of the best-selling music downloads in the UK each year.

Most-downloaded singles by year

Most-downloaded albums by year

See also
List of best-selling compilation albums by year in the United Kingdom

References

External links
Singles Download Chart at the Official Charts Company
The Official UK Download Chart at MTV UK

Music downloads by year (UK)